The Web Services Interoperability Organization (WS-I) was an industry consortium created in 2002 and chartered to promote interoperability amongst the stack of web services specifications. WS-I did not define standards for web services; rather, it created guidelines and tests for interoperability. 
In July 2010, WS-I joined the OASIS, standardization consortium as a member section. 
It operated until December 2017. 
The WS-I standards were then maintained by relevant technical committees within OASIS.

It was governed by a board of directors consisting of the founding members (IBM, Microsoft, BEA Systems, SAP, Oracle, Fujitsu, Hewlett-Packard, and Intel) and two elected members (Sun Microsystems and webMethods). After it joined OASIS, other organizations have joined the WS-I technical committee including CA Technologies, JumpSoft and Booz Allen Hamilton. 

The organization's deliverables included profiles, sample applications that demonstrate the profiles' use, and test tools to help determine profile conformance.

WS-I Profiles 

According to WS-I, a profile is
A set of named web services specifications at specific revision levels, together with a set of implementation and interoperability guidelines recommending how the specifications may be used to develop interoperable web services.

 WS-I Basic Profile
 WS-I Basic Security Profile
 Simple Soap Binding Profile

WS-I Profile Compliance 

The WS-I is not a certifying authority; thus, every vendor can claim to be compliant to a profile. However the use of the test tool is required before a company can claim a product to be compliant. See WS-I Trademarks and Compliance claims requirements

See also
Web Services Resource Framework
OASIS

References

External links 
 WS-I consortium's Home Page
 WS-I OASIS member section Home page (2010-2017, maintained as archive by OASIS)
 The Microsoft - WS-I controversy, cnet news, May 2002

Web services
Interoperability